Charlie Chan on Broadway (1937) is a Charlie Chan film. This is the 15th film starring Oland as Chan and produced by Fox.

Plot
While Charlie Chan and his number one son, Lee, are aboard a New York-bound transatlantic liner returning from Germany in their previous adventure (Charlie Chan at the Olympics), they have a run-in with a mysterious woman, named Billie Bronson, who secretes a package in the trunk of the Chans. After the liner docks, Chan and Lee are met at the pier by Inspector Nelson and two rival reporters, Joan Wendall and Speed Patton. Bille, having left the country hurriedly a year ago when sought as a material witness in a political scandal, has returned to "blow the lid off the town." She follows the Chans to their hotel and attempts to regain her package from the trunk, only to be interrupted by Lee. She then goes to the "Hottentot Club", where "candid-camera night" is in full progress, followed by Lee. Already present are Joan and Speed. Billie is mysteriously murdered and Charlie is summoned from a police banquet in his honor. Present in the room with the body are club manager Johnny Burke; club dancer and Burke's girl-friend Marie Collins and the two reporters. While seeking a motive for the murder, a second killing is discovered in Charlie's hotel room, the package is missing from Charlie's trunk and it is realized that it must have contained her diary. Charlie neatly puts together a few scattered clues and then springs a trap to confirm the identity of the killer.

Cast 
 Warner Oland as Charlie Chan
 Keye Luke as Lee Chan
 Joan Marsh as Joan Wendall
 Marc Lawrence as Thomas Mitchell
 J. Edward Bromberg as Murdock
 Douglas Fowley as Johnny Burke
 Harold Huber as Chief Inspector James Nelson
 Donald Woods as Speed Patten
 Louise Henry as Billie Bronson
 Joan Woodbury as Marie Collins
 Leon Ames as Buzz Moran
 Eugene Borden as Louie 
 Creighton Hale as Reporter (uncredited)

External links

Charlie Chan films
1937 films
1937 drama films
American black-and-white films
1930s English-language films
20th Century Fox films
Films directed by Eugene Forde
1930s mystery drama films
American mystery drama films
Films scored by Samuel Kaylin
1930s American films